Wang Wu is the romanisation of a number of different Chinese characters and may refer to:

Wang Wu, a Chinese placeholder name
Dadao Wang Wu, the sobriquet of martial artist Wang Zhengyi
Wang Wu (painter), a 17th-century Chinese painter
Mount Wangwu, an alternative name for which is Wang Wu Mountain

See also
Wu Wang (disambiguation), a traditional title of founding emperors in China

Human name disambiguation pages